High Urpeth is a village in County Durham, in England. It is situated to the west of Urpeth, and a short distance to the north of High Handenhold.

Villages in County Durham